The 17th Annual Screen Actors Guild Awards, honoring the best achievements in film and television performances for the year 2010, was presented on January 30, 2011 at the Shrine Exposition Center in Los Angeles, California for the fifteenth consecutive year. It was broadcast live simultaneously by TNT and TBS.

The nominees were announced on December 16, 2010 by Rosario Dawson and Angie Harmon at Los Angeles' Pacific Design Center's Silver Screen Theater.

Winners and nominees
Winners are listed first and highlighted in boldface.

Film

Television

Screen Actors Guild Life Achievement Award
 Ernest Borgnine

In Memoriam
Hilary Swank introduced the "In Memoriam" segment which paid tribute to the life and career of actors who died in 2010:

 Jill Clayburgh
 Leslie Nielsen
 Lynn Redgrave
 Robert Culp
 Gloria Stuart
 Kevin McCarthy
 John Forsythe
 Anne Francis
 Pernell Roberts
 Harold Gould
 David Nelson
 Frances Reid
 Larry Keith
 Patricia Neal
 Danny Aiello III
 June Havoc
 James MacArthur
 Barbara Billingsley
 Gary Coleman
 Rue McClanahan
 Zelda Rubinstein
 Fred Foy
 Janet MacLachlan
 Fess Parker
 Lena Horne
 Peter Haskell
 Peter Graves
 Dixie Carter
 Tom Bosley
 Kathryn Grayson
 Pete Postlethwaite
 Steve Landesberg
 Eddie Fisher
 Tony Curtis
 Jean Simmons
 Dennis Hopper

References

External links
 

2010
2010 film awards
2010 television awards
2010 guild awards
Screen Actors Guild
Screen
Screen
January 2011 events in the United States